Shaun Ryan is an Australian rules football field umpire in the Australian Football League.

Biography
Born in 1975, Ryan  was  educated  at  Warrnambool's  Christian Brothers'  College  and  Emmanuel College  before  heading to  Geelong's Deakin University  where he graduated  with both arts  and  law degrees.

Career
Considered one of the league's best umpires of his time, Ryan  umpired in five Grand Finals between 2008 and 2011 (which included both the drawn Grand Final and replay in 2010) before temporarily retiring at the end of 2011 after 215 games. He returned to senior umpiring in 2015 after three years hiatus, and umpired his sixth Grand Final in 2017 at the age of 42, and his seventh in 2018. Ryan was generally criticised for his team's umpiring performance and subsequent defence of the criticism following the 2019 AFL ANZAC Day clash between Essendon and Collingwood. The game made headlines due to significant booing at the end of the game and post-match by Essendon supporters who were angered by what they perceived as a series of poor umpiring decisions in the final quarter.

Outside football, Ryan works as a barrister. His twin brother Patrick Ryan and his other brother Simon are both horse trainers in his local Warrnambool area.

Shaun also placed 6th in the 2014 Fiji International Triathlon overcoming injury and tough competition.

He is also favourite for the 2016 Riptide Triathlon - a triathlon named in his honour and run at Anglesea.

He officiated his final AFL match in the 2020 Preliminary Final clash between the Brisbane Lions and Geelong Cats at The Gabba on Saturday the 17th of October 2020.

References

Australian Football League umpires
Living people
1975 births